The 2020 Cyprus Women's Cup was the 13th edition of the Cyprus Women's Cup, an invitational women's football tournament held annually in Cyprus. It took place from 5 to 11 March 2020.

Croatia won the tournament for the first time.

Venues

Teams

Thailand were going to compete, but withdrew on 24 February 2020, due to coronavirus fears.

Squads

Standings
As there was an uneven number of matches played, a coefficient-system was used to determine the final positions.

Matches
All times are local (UTC+2).

Goalscorers

References

External links
Official website

Cyprus Women's Cup
Cyprus Women's Cup
Cyprus Women's Cup
Cyprus Women's Cup